Giacomo Gatti (born mid-18th century, died 1817) was an Italian painter of the late-Baroque, active mainly in his native Mantua.

He was a pupil of Giovanni Cadioli (died 1767) at the Academy of Art in Mantua. He is best known for painting landscapes and ornament as decoration for frescoes. He worked in the house of Marchese Castiglioni in Mantua and his villa at Casatico.

References

1817 deaths
18th-century Italian painters
Italian male painters
19th-century Italian painters
19th-century Italian male artists
Painters from Mantua
Italian Baroque painters
Year of birth missing
18th-century Italian male artists